Nathana is a town and a municipal council in the Bathinda district of the Indian state of Punjab.

References

Bathinda
Cities and towns in Bathinda district